Captain John Stockham (24 July 1765 – 6 February 1814) was an officer in the Royal Navy during the Napoleonic Wars, whose career is now obscured to the point that very little of his life is known up until 1805, when he was suddenly and unexpectedly called upon to command the ship of the line  at the Battle of Trafalgar.

Early career
Stockham was born in July 1765 to a middle class Devon family, and was baptised in Exeter on 24 July. The date he joined the navy is not known and neither is the ship he joined, but it is likely that he was at sea before the end of the American War of Independence and may have seen action there, although this can not be proven. He was promoted to lieutenant on 29 April 1797 when he was 32, a full fourteen years after the normal age for this promotion. This was likely the result of a failure to gain interest or sponsorship from an admiral, politician or other person of influence.

Napoleonic Wars
The next time Stockham appears in the historical record is after the Peace of Amiens, where he was first lieutenant of HMS Thunderer. Thunderer had participated in the Battle of Cape Finisterre in July 1805 under her captain, William Lechmere, and Lechmere had then become embroiled in the controversy surrounding Sir Robert Calder's conduct in the action. Durham refused but Brown and Lechmere did not, leaving their first lieutenants in charge of their ships.

Battle of Trafalgar
At the battle, on 21 October 1805, Thunderers position was towards the rear of Collingwood's division, and so she did not reach the action until well on into the day. Nonetheless, Stockham and Thunderer performed admirably, engaging the Spanish flagship Principe de Asturias and the French Neptune. Thunderer suffered 16 casualties but remained largely intact, which enabled her to aid more battered ships during the storm which followed.

Later life
Following the action, Stockham was granted a gold medal and sword from the Lloyd's Patriotic Fund, and was promoted to Post Captain on Christmas Day of that year. Stockham, like many other officers who served in the battle, was unable to find a ship for future service. He retired to Exeter a few years later, where he lived peacefully until his death in 1814. He was buried in a family plot in St Sidwell's Church, but German bombing during the Blitz destroyed his grave.

Citations

References

Further reading 
The Trafalgar Captains, Colin White and the 1805 Club, Chatham Publishing, London, 2005,

External links
John Stockham bio
Animation of the Battle of Trafalgar

1765 births
1814 deaths
Military personnel from Exeter
Royal Navy captains at the Battle of Trafalgar
Royal Navy personnel of the French Revolutionary Wars
Royal Navy personnel of the Napoleonic Wars